Ormesby St Margaret with Scratby is a civil parish in the English county of Norfolk. It is made up of the inland village of Ormesby St Margaret and the adjacent seaside resorts of Scratby and California.

For the purposes of local government, the parish falls within the district of Great Yarmouth.

Great Ormesby railway station was once located here on the line between Great Yarmouth and Melton Constable. It is now closed.

California owes its name to the discovery of some 16th-century gold coins on the beach in 1848, at a time when the California gold rush had captured the attention of the world. The 1940s Home front museum Blitz and Pieces is based in the parish.

Toponymy 
The name 'Ormesby' means 'Omr's farm/settlement'.

Scratby's name origin is not known.

Governance
Ormesby electoral ward  includes Ormesby St Michael and had a total population at the 2011 Census of 4,268.

Parish Church

St Margaret's Parish Church dates back to the 14th century. It is said that Alice Clere (d. 1 November 1538) made sure that the church tower was completed, as the workmen had taken far too long. Alice Clere, the daughter of Sir William Boleyn of Blickling, was an aunt of Queen Anne Boleyn. Vide: interior and exterior photographs available through external links.

Scratby Hall

Scratby Hall, the country house of John Ramey, was occupied by his daughter, the Dowager Countess of Home, until her death in 1814. The house was originally built by John Fisher, Esq.
John Ramey, Esq., an attorney, then barrister, retired to Scratby Hall, where he died in 1796. He let a house in Scratby to the diarist Sylas Neville between 1769 and 1772, who describes his encounters with local society including John Ramey.
From 1949 to the mid-1980s, the home and estate served as Duncan Hall School. In 1989, a fire damaged 40% of the 11 bedroom country house.

Notable residents
 Thomas Webster (1631–1715), who was born in Ormesby St. Margaret and eventually settled in New Hampshire, was the great-great-grandfather of the prominent 19th century American politician Daniel Webster.

Notes

External links
 for Ormesby St Margaret
 for Scratby
Ormesby Medical Centre
Ormesby, Scratby and California Community
Information from Genuki Norfolk on Ormesby St Margaret
Interior and exterior photographs of Parish Church
 http://kepn.nottingham.ac.uk/map/place/Norfolk/Ormesby%20St%20Margaret%20&%20St%20Michael

External links

Civil parishes in Norfolk
Populated coastal places in Norfolk
Beaches of Norfolk
Borough of Great Yarmouth